Horsetail Falls or Horsetail Fall may refer to the following waterfalls:

Australia
Horsetail Falls (Tasmania, Australia)

United States
Horsetail Falls (Oregon)
Horsetail Fall (Yosemite), in California
Horsetail Falls (California), in the Sierra Nevada mountain range
Horsetail Falls (Montana), a waterfall of Montana
Horsetail Falls (Alaska)

See also
List of waterfalls by type#Horsetail